The Battle of Simancas (also called Alhandega or al-Khandaq) was a military battle that started on 19 July 939 in the Iberian Peninsula between the troops of the King of León Ramiro II and Cordovan caliph Abd al-Rahman III near the walls of the city of Simancas.

The battle unfolded after the army of Abd al-Rahman III launched toward the northern Christian territories in 934. Abd al-Rahman III had gathered a large army of caliphal fighters, with the help of the Andalusian governor of Zaragoza, Muhammad ibn Yahya al-Tujibi. The Leonese king Ramiro II led the counterattack with an army constituted of his own troops, those of Castile under Count Fernán González, and the Navarrese under García Sánchez I.

Arab witnesses chronicle a spectacular eclipse of the sun that took place on the first day of the battle:

As the army arrived near Simancas, there was an awful eclipse of the sun that covered the earth of a dark yellow amid the day and it filled us and the infidels with terror as neither had seen in their life such a thing as this. Two days passed without either side making any movement.

The battle lasted some days, with the allied Christian troops emerging victorious and routing the Cordovan forces. Furtun ibn Muhammad al-Tawil, wali of Huesca, withheld his troops from the battle. He was hunted down near Calatayud by Salama ibn Ahmad ibn Salama, taken to Córdoba, and crucified in front of its Al-Qasr.

References

Bibliography 

 
 

Simancas
Simancas
Simancas
10th century in the Kingdom of León
939
Simancas
History of the province of Valladolid
Solar eclipses